The Van Beuren Corporation was a New York City-based animation studio that produced theatrical cartoons as well as live-action short-subjects from the 1920s to 1936.

History 
In 1920, the Keith-Albee organization formed Fables Pictures for the production of the Aesop's Film Fables cartoon series with Paul Terry, who himself owned 10 percent of the studio. Producer Amedee J. Van Beuren bought out the studio in 1928, retaining Terry and renaming the business after its new owner. Van Beuren released Terry's first sound cartoon Dinner Time (1928) (a month before Disney's Steamboat Willie) through Pathé Exchange, which later became part of RKO Pictures. Terry ran the animation studio while Van Beuren focused on other parts of the business. In 1929, Terry quit to start his own Terrytoons studio and John Foster took over the animation department.

Van Beuren released his films through RKO Radio Pictures. The early sound Van Beuren cartoons are almost identical to the late silent cartoons: highly visual, with little dialogue and occasional sound effects. Bandleaders Gene Rodemich and Winston Sharples supervised the music. The company's main cartoon characters were "Tom and Jerry", a tall-and-short pair, usually vagrants who attempted various occupations. They share no relation to MGM's more successful Tom and Jerry, a cat and mouse, and the older series has been renamed "Van Beuren's Tom and Jerry" and "Dick and Larry" in various future incarnations. Van Beuren was keenly aware that successful cartoons often featured animated "stars," and urged his staff to come up with new ideas for characters. Cubby, a mischievous little bear, resulted.

In 1932, Van Beuren planned to release a series of wild-animal shorts featuring celebrity explorer Frank Buck. RKO executives were so impressed by these Van Beuren shorts that they decided to combine them into a feature film, Bring 'Em Back Alive. This was a very successful business move, but it left both Van Beuren and RKO with a void in their short-subject schedule. Van Beuren, forced to act quickly, found an existing series of two-reel comedies: Charlie Chaplin's 12 productions for the Mutual film company, produced in 1916-17. Van Beuren paid $10,000 each for the shorts, and assigned his animation department to create new music and sound effects for the silent films. Bandleader Gene Rodemich and Rodemich's assistant and successor Winston Sharples assembled new scores. RKO released the Van Beuren Chaplins in 1933–34. Chaplin did not own these films; author Michael J. Hayde discloses that Chaplin had declined several opportunities to purchase them.

The Van Beuren Corporation acquired and produced live-action features such as Adventure Girl (1934) and two more Frank Buck safaris, Wild Cargo (1934) and Frank Buck's Fang and Claw (1935). Other Van Beuren live-action productions included a "Van Beuren Vagabond" travelogue series, a series of novelty shorts narrated by the radio comedy team Easy Aces (Goodman Ace and Jane Ace) and musical comedy shorts featuring Bert Lahr, Shemp Howard, among others.

Van Beuren remained unsatisfied, and agreed to license the popular comic-strip character The Little King and the radio comedy act, Amos 'n' Andy to adapt into animated cartoons. Neither series was successful. Van Beuren then hired Walt Disney director Burt Gillett and animator Tom Palmer to create a new series of color cartoons. These "Rainbow Parade" cartoons featured established characters: Felix the Cat, Parrotville Parrots, Molly Moo-Cow, and the Toonerville Trolley gang.

Closure 
These full-color Van Beuren efforts were well received, and Van Beuren had finally succeeded in sponsoring a popular cartoon series. However, RKO entered into a deal to distribute new color cartoons produced by industry leader Walt Disney. RKO, no longer needing Van Beuren's cartoons, abandoned the Rainbow Parade shorts.

Amedee J. Van Beuren fell ill during this time. In July 1938, he had a stroke that would eventually lead to his death on November 12, 1938 by heart attack.

During his recovery from his stroke, Van Beuren closed his studio rather than accept unionization that had caused the studio problems in 1935.

The Van Beuren library was sold to various television, reissue, and home-movie distributors in the 1940s and 1950s, including Unity Pictures, Walter Gutlohn/Library Films, Commonwealth Pictures, and Official Films. The library eventually lapsed into the public domain.

Productions 
Animation:
 Aesop's Fables
 Cubby Bear
 Amos 'n' Andy
 The Little King
 Rainbow Parade (color series)
 Felix the Cat
 Molly Moo-Cow
 Burt Gillett's Toddle Tales
 Tom and Jerry 
 Toonerville Trolley
 Parrotville

Live-action:
 James the Cat
 Stung (1931)
 Bring 'Em Back Alive (1932)
 Adventure Girl (1934)
 Wild Cargo (1934)
 Fang and Claw (1935)

References

External links 
 Full list of Van Beuren cartoons from the Big Cartoon Database
 Biography of Amedee J. Van Beuren
 Swiss Trick on Archive.org

 
American animation studios
Mass media companies established in 1921
Mass media companies disestablished in 1936
American companies established in 1921
1921 establishments in New York City
1936 disestablishments in New York (state)
American companies disestablished in 1936